Cada Que... (literal translation "Everytime That..." is the third single in Mexico and second worldwide single from Belanova's third studio album, Fantasía Pop. The song had been sent out to radio outlets by the end of October 2007 backed with "Baila Mi Corazón" remixes. Along with "Baila Mi Corazón", it has sold over 200,000 downloads in the United States. The song has brought them success in the United States, becoming the band's first single to break the Top Ten of the Hot Latin Tracks chart.

Music video
The music video was filmed in Mexico City in early November 2007. The video premiered on December 14 on Ritmoson Latino.

Formats and track listings
CD Promo & Digital Release - EP
"Cada Que..." [Album Version] - 3:42
"Baila Mi Corazón" [Mijangos Bossa Edit] - 3:59
"Baila Mi Corazón" [Imazue Latin Soul Mix Edit] - 4:05

Charts

See also
List of number-one songs of 2008 (Mexico)

References

2007 singles
Belanova songs
Spanish-language songs
Monitor Latino Top General number-one singles
2007 songs
Universal Music Group singles
Songs written by Denisse Guerrero
Songs written by Edgar Huerta
Songs written by Ricardo Arreola